The 1901 Utah Agricultural Aggies football team was an American football team that represented Utah Agricultural College (later renamed Utah State University) during the 1901 college football season. In their first and only season under head coach Dick Richards, the Aggies compiled a 3–2 record and outscored opponents by a total of 41 to 40.

Schedule

References

Utah Agricultural
Utah State Aggies football seasons
Utah Agricultural Aggies football